Argishti may refer to:

Argishtis I of Urartu - 785 - 763 BCE
Argishti II of Urartu - 714 - 685 BCE
Argishti, Yerevan, a village